Triple M Perth (official callsign: 6MMM) is a commercial radio station owned and operated by Southern Cross Austereo as part of the Triple M network. The station is broadcast to Perth, Western Australia from studios in Subiaco.

The station commenced broadcasting in 1937 as 6PM, initially on the AM band at a frequency of 1000 kilohertz, before converting to the FM band as 6PM-FM on 31 December 1990. The station was later branded as PMFM, The All New 92.9, 92.9 and Hit 92.9. On 1 December 2020, the station was relaunched as Triple M, switching network affiliation with sister station Mix 94.5.

History
92.9 was originally 6PM on the AM band, beginning broadcasting on 22 April 1937 making it the third commercial radio station in Perth. Originally broadcasting from a radio mast in Fremantle, the station moved its transmission mast to Coffee Point in South Perth in 1940 to give better reception to listeners north of Perth.

By the 1960s, 1970s and 1980s, it broadcast a Top 40 format on 1000, later 990 kHz. The station secured significant listener market (ACNielsen) share despite a rival station (96FM) gaining a monopoly on the FM band in the 1980s.

On 31 December 1990, the station was one of two additional Perth radio stations to gain a licence to convert to the FM band. They became 92.9 6PM-FM; then subsequently PMFM. The official call sign was changed to 6PPM for regulatory purposes to reflect the move to FM. During most of the 1990s PMFM was Perth's number one radio station.

2001 saw PMFM change their name to The All New 92.9, and then to just 92.9. In February 2006, 92.9 changed its logo in line with the rest of the Today Network. In 2007 92.9 and sister station Mix 94.5 moved to a new purpose-built building at 450 Roberts Road, Subiaco.

On 19 January 2015, Southern Cross Austereo rebranded 92.9 as Hit 92.9.

On 1 December 2020, Hit 92.9 relaunched as Triple M Perth, joining the Triple M network and adopting a mainstream rock music format. The Hit Network affiliation was switched to sister station Mix 94.5. The station was officially launched at 8:00am with a welcome message from Foo Fighters frontman Dave Grohl, with "All My Life" being the first song played on the newly relaunched station. The station later announced that Channel 7 broadcaster and Perth Lord Mayor Basil Zempilas would host the stations breakfast program along wth former AFL footballer Xavier Ellis and The West Australian columnist Jenna Clarke from 2021.

Transmission

Since being on the FM band, Triple M Perth has broadcast from a transmitter site next to the Channel 7 tower from Bickley in the Perth Hills. It shares its transmitter with sister station Mix 94.5 and 96fm. They use a combiner and share the same antenna array. The Bickley site is redundant now and the main site is at Carmel into the same antenna array as Nova 93.7 and Mix 94.5. The original AM transmitter for 6PM was at Coffee Point in Applecross. The ERP is at 40 kW, covering the north and south of Perth. As well as covering Perth, Triple M 92.9 can be heard as far north as New Norcia, south to Waroona and east to Northam.

Digital radio
Triple M Perth is simulcast on digital radio in Perth.

Triple M Perth launched Choose The Hits Jelli, a station only broadcast on digital radio, was launched on 1 February 2010, and closed on 26 May 2010.

See also
 List of radio stations in Australia

References

Further reading
 Business as usual for radio stations says Gary Roberts. Radio stations sold by Jack Bendat to Austereo for $100m. managing director Gary Roberts to stay on. Campaign brief Sept.1997, p. 6
 Miraudo, Nadio.Snap, crackle and pop. Popular breakfast radio announcers in competition to win competitive breakfast radio ratings – MIX 94.5 Botica's bunch (Paul Shepherd, Lisa Shaw and Fred Botica), 96 FM's Paul Redmond and Bary Kay battle with 92.9 PMFM's Gary Shannon, Jane Marwick and Bernie Brittain. Sunday Times (Perth, W.A.) 6 August 2000, p. 41,

External links
 Triple M Perth
 92.9 Triple M Perth
 Southern Cross Austereo

Radio stations in Perth, Western Australia
Radio stations established in 1937
Mainstream rock radio stations in Australia
1937 establishments in Australia